Nicholas David Barratt (born 16 May 1970) is an English genealogist and Director of Senate House Library at the University of London. He is best known as genealogical consultant for series 1 to 4 of the BBC show Who Do You Think You Are?. Barratt is the CEO of Sticks Research Agency and personal heritage site Nation's Memory Bank. He also presents Live the Dream: As Seen on TV with Melissa Porter.

Biography
Barratt was born at Hammersmith, London. He was educated at Hampton School, and took a PhD in history from King's College London, before completing his PhD in state finance and fiscal history also from King's College London. He then worked at the Public Record Office, now The National Archives, from 1996 to 2000 before leaving to work as a specialist researcher at the BBC, whilst establishing Sticks Research Agency. He is also CEO of Nation's Memory Bank and advisor at Digital Estate Corporation. He is currently involved in the project the Family History Show, a genealogy video magazine.

In April 2018 Barratt was appointed Director of Senate House Library at the University of London.

Television
Barratt has made numerous TV appearances, and his credits include House Detectives, Invasion, Omnibus and the BAFTA-nominated Seven Wonders of the Industrial World. Since 2002, he has moved into presenting, History Mysteries, Hidden House History and So You Think You’re Royal on television, and Tracing Your Roots for Radio 4. He also presented the research strands for BBC's Who Do You Think You Are? DVD.

Published works
Tracing the History of Your House (Public Record Office, 2001)
House History Starter Pack (Public Record Office, 2002)
History Trail (BBC, 2002)
Your Family's War History (BBC Learning, 2004)
Who Do You Think You Are?: Trace Your Family Tree Back to the Tudors (with Anton Gill; HarperCollins, 2006)
Genealogy Online for Dummies (Wiley, 2006)
The Family Detective (Ebury, 2006)
Who Do You Think You Are?: Discovering the Heroes and Villains in Your Family (with Dan Waddell; HarperCollins, 2006)
Lost Voices from the Titanic: The Definitive Oral History (Preface, 2009)

Barratt's other works include numerous academic articles and volumes on medieval history. He writes a weekly column for The Daily Telegraph and is a regular contributor to various family history magazines.

References

External links

Nick Barratt
Sticks Research Agency
Nations' Memorybank
Family History Show

1970 births
Living people
Alumni of King's College London
English columnists
English genealogists
English television presenters
People educated at Hampton School
People from Hammersmith
People associated with the University of London
People associated with The National Archives (United Kingdom)